Edwin Walter Chadwick (born May 8, 1933) is a Canadian retired ice hockey goaltender who played in the National Hockey League for the Toronto Maple Leafs and the Boston Bruins between 1955 and 1962. The rest of his career, which lasted from 1952 to 1968, was spent in various minor leagues.

Playing career
Chadwick started his NHL career in the 1955–56 season by playing five games for the Toronto Maple Leafs as a replacement for injured future-hall-of-famer Harry Lumley. Over the next two seasons Chadwick would play 140 consecutive regular season games, which is still a Leafs team record. However Chadwick's success in the NHL was short-lived, as his playing time dropped off and he was shipped down to the Rochester Americans of the American Hockey League. Chadwick only managed to play four more NHL games, as a member of the Boston Bruins in 1961–62. Chadwick would play the remainder of his days in the AHL, first for the Hershey Bears, and then the Buffalo Bisons before retiring in 1968.

Scouting career
Sometime after he retired from playing he became a scout for the Edmonton Oilers. He won 5 Stanley Cups rings with them  1984–85–87–88–90, and his name was put on the Stanley Cup 1985, 1987, and 1990.

Career statistics

Regular season and playoffs

Awards
AHL First All-Star Team (1960)
AHL Second All-Star team (1961, 1965)
Harry "Hap" Holmes Memorial Award Winner for fewest goals allowed in the AHL (1960)
NHL - Stanley Cup (Edmonton) (1987, 1990)

External links 

1933 births
Living people
Boston Bruins players
Buffalo Bisons (AHL) players
Buffalo Sabres coaches
Buffalo Sabres scouts
California Golden Seals
Edmonton Oilers scouts
Hershey Bears players
Kingston Frontenacs (EPHL) players
New York Islanders scouts
Ontario Hockey Association Senior A League (1890–1979) players
People from Centre Wellington
Pittsburgh Penguins scouts
Rochester Americans players
Stanley Cup champions
Toronto Maple Leafs players
Toronto St. Michael's Majors players
Winnipeg Warriors (minor pro) players
Canadian ice hockey goaltenders
Canadian ice hockey coaches